
Gmina Zabłudów is an urban-rural gmina (administrative district) in Białystok County, Podlaskie Voivodeship, in north-eastern Poland.

Villages
Apart from the town of Zabłudów, Gmina Zabłudów contains the villages and settlements of Aleksicze, Bobrowa, Ciełuszki, Dawidowicze, Dobrzyniówka, Dojlidy-Kolonia, Folwarki Małe, Folwarki Tylwickie, Folwarki Wielkie, Gnieciuki, Halickie, Kamionka, Kaniuki, Kołpaki, Kowalowce, Koźliki, Krynickie, Kucharówka, Kudrycze, Kuriany, Laszki, Łubniki, Łukiany, Małynka, Miniewicze, Nowosady, Ochremowicze, Olszanka, Ostrówki, Pasynki, Pawły, Płoskie, Protasy, Rafałówka, Ryboły, Rzepniki, Sieśki, Skrybicze, Solniki, Tatarowce, Zabłudów-Kolonia, Zacisze, Zagórki, Zagruszany, Zajezierce, Żuki, Zwierki and Żywkowo.

Neighbouring gminy
Gmina Zabłudów is bordered by the city of Białystok and by the gminy of Bielsk Podlaski, Gródek, Juchnowiec Kościelny, Michałowo, Narew, and Supraśl.

References
Polish official population figures 2006

Białystok County
Zabludow